No Greater Glory is a 1934 American Pre-Code allegorical anti-war film directed by Frank Borzage and based on the novel A Pál utcai fiúk by Ferenc Molnár, known in English as "The Boys of Paul Street." The film's box office performance was described as "dismal".

The film is noteworthy for employing mostly children in its cast; adults only appear in the opening scenes and then fleetingly thereafter. The action centers around an abandoned lumberyard where small kids play army. When a group of older boys unilaterally decide that they will take over the space for themselves, the younger children find themselves with little choice but to play soldiers for real, with tragedy almost inevitable.

Despite its box office failure, it has since become reappraised as an important film, with Leonard Maltin describing it in his Classic Movie Guide as "deeply felt" and "passionately acted," while Borzage authority Michael Grost noted its depiction of "the insidious appeal of militarism."

On August 23, 2019, Sony Pictures Home Entertainment released it as a Region 1 Made On Demand DVD.

Cast
 George P. Breakston as Nemecsek
 Jimmy Butler as Boka
 Jackie Searl as Gereb
 Frankie Darro as Feri Ats
 Donald Haines as Csonakos
 Rolf Ernest as Ferdie Pasztor
 Julius Molnar as Henry Pasztor
 Wesley Giraud as Kolnay
 Beaudine Anderson as Csele
 Ralph Morgan as Nemecsek's father
 Lois Wilson as Nemecsek's mother 
 Christian Rub as The Watchman

References

External links

1934 films
American war drama films
Anti-war films
American black-and-white films
Columbia Pictures films
Films based on Hungarian novels
Films based on works by Ferenc Molnár
Films directed by Frank Borzage
American political drama films
Films produced by Frank Borzage
Films with screenplays by Jo Swerling
Films scored by Louis Silvers
1930s political drama films
1930s war drama films
1934 drama films
1930s English-language films
1930s American films